Simmons Bank Arena (previously Verizon Arena and Alltel Arena) is an 18,000-seat multi-purpose arena in North Little Rock, Arkansas, directly across the Arkansas River from downtown Little Rock. Opened in October 1999, it is the main entertainment venue serving Central Arkansas.

The Little Rock Trojans, representing the University of Arkansas at Little Rock in NCAA Division I sports, played home basketball games at the arena from the time the arena opened until the team moved in 2005 to a new arena, the Jack Stephens Center, on the school's campus in Little Rock. The Arkansas RiverBlades, a defunct ice hockey team of the ECHL; the Arkansas RimRockers, a defunct minor league basketball team of the NBA Development League; and the Arkansas Twisters, a defunct af2 team, also played at the arena. The arena is also used for concerts, rodeos, auto racing, professional wrestling, and trade shows and conventions.

History
On August 1, 1995, Pulaski County, Arkansas, voters approved a one-year, one-cent sales tax for the purpose of building a multi-purpose arena, expanding the Statehouse Convention Center in Little Rock, and making renovations to the Main Street bridge between Little Rock and North Little Rock. $20 million of the sales tax proceeds went toward the Convention Center expansion, with the remainder used to build the arena.

That money—combined with a $20 million contribution from the State of Arkansas, $17 million from private sources, and $7 million from Little Rock-based Alltel Corporation—paid for the construction of the  arena, which cost nearly $80 million to build. When its doors opened in 1999, the facility was paid for, and there was no public indebtedness.

Two sites in North Little Rock drew interest from county officials for the proposed arena. The first was a  commercial site west of Interstate 30, which contained a strip mall, a Kroger, and an abandoned Kmart storefront. The second site was an  plot at the foot of the Broadway Bridge.

The Pulaski County Multipurpose Civic Center Facilities Board selected the larger site for the arena in 1996 and paid $3.7 million for the land, some of which was acquired through eminent domain, a move protested in court by several landowners.

The second site later would be chosen for the new baseball stadium, Dickey-Stephens Park, constructed for the Arkansas Travelers. The Class AA minor-league baseball team moved from the then 73-year-old Ray Winder Field in Little Rock to a new $28 million home in North Little Rock at the start of the 2007 season.

The arena was the home of the 2003, 2006, and 2009 Southeastern Conference women's basketball tournament and the 2000 Sun Belt Conference men's basketball tournament. The arena holds the all-time attendance record for an SEC Women's Tournament when 43,642 people attended the event in 2003.

The arena hosted portions of the first and second rounds of the NCAA Division I men's basketball tournament in March 2008 and the SEC gymnastics championships in 2007.

As a concert venue, its location prompted Bruce Springsteen and the E Street Band to play one of its most rarely performed numbers, 1973's "Mary Queen of Arkansas", during a March 2000 show on their Reunion Tour.

The arena is owned by the Multi-Purpose Civic Center Facilities Board for Pulaski County. The arena was designed by the Civic Center Design Team (CCDT), Burt Taggart & Associates, Architects/Engineers, The Wilcox Group, Garver & Garver Engineering and Rosser International of Atlanta.

The arena held the 2004, 2007 and 2009 American Idols LIVE! Tour concerts on August 13, 2004, July 13, 2007, and July 25, 2009, respectively.

The arena's 20-year naming rights were part of a $28.1 billion sale of Alltel to Verizon Wireless, effective on June 30, 2009, with Alltel Arena renamed as Verizon Arena.

Fleetwood Mac performed at the arena May 4, 2013, with surprise guests former President Bill Clinton and First Lady Hillary Clinton attending the show. Fleetwood Mac drummer Mick Fleetwood introduced the couple, who were seated in an arena suite, to the sold-out audience and dedicated the song "Don't Stop" to them, which was Bill Clinton's 1992 presidential election campaign song.

On October 5, 2016, the arena hosted the Kellogg's Tour of Gymnastics Champions.

With expiration of initial naming rights due in 2019, new naming rights for the arena were purchased by Arkansas-based Simmons Bank in a deal announced on November 9, 2018; the name change became official on October 3, 2019.

References

External links

American Basketball Association (2000–present) venues
Little Rock Trojans men's basketball
Basketball venues in Arkansas
College basketball venues in the United States
Convention centers in Arkansas
Defunct basketball venues in the United States
Defunct indoor ice hockey venues in the United States
Gymnastics venues in the United States
Indoor arenas in Arkansas
Sports in Little Rock, Arkansas
Sports venues in Arkansas
Verizon Communications
Buildings and structures in Pulaski County, Arkansas
Tourist attractions in Pulaski County, Arkansas
1999 establishments in Arkansas
Sports venues completed in 1999